Barbens is a municipality in the comarca of the Pla d'Urgell in Catalonia, Spain. As of 2007, it has 836 inhabitants. The municipality is split into two parts, the bigger western part containing Barbens town.

Demography

References

External links
Official website 
 Government data pages 

Municipalities in Pla d'Urgell
Populated places in Pla d'Urgell